The Maltese Islands, although small in area (316 km2), host many endemic species. This may make the organism endangered. These endemic species are important to the Maltese Islands because they form part of Maltese national heritage and are topics of scientific research.

Introduction
Of the 10,000 estimated terrestrial and freshwater species in the Maltese archipelago, 78 are endemic, a large number considering the country's size. Only 4,500 species have so far been identified, and others still await correct taxonomic classification, which means that there may be several more endemic species yet to be discovered.

Twenty-three of the endemic species are vascular plants and plants such as bryophytes, while the remaining 55 species are animals.

Plants
Malta hosts around 860 plants of indigenous nature, occurring in the archipelago before man. Another 20 taxa are considered archaeophytes, being introduced through human intervention but having established themselves before 1500 AD A further 180 taxa are of uncertain origin, whilst at least 640 taxa are considered neophytes, having been introduced after 1500 AD, and may include casual alien species. Most importantly, at least 24 endemic vascular plants, and 18 vascular plants that are sub-endemic to the Mediterranean region.

Endemic vascular plants

Sub-endemic vascular plants

Animals

There are more endemic animals than plants in the Maltese Islands, they are often subspecies of species in nearby countries e.g. the Sicilian shrew in Gozo which has been defined as a subspecies of its own. Endemic animal species include:

See also

Flora of Malta
List of birds of Malta
List of mammals of Malta

References

Biota of Malta
malta